In the United Kingdom, chinky (or chinky chonky,) is a slur for a Chinese takeaway restaurant or Chinese food and Chinese people.

In 2002, the Broadcasting Standards Commission, after a complaint about the BBC One programme The Vicar of Dibley, held that when used as the name of a type of restaurant or meal, rather than as an adjective applied to a person or group of people, the word still carries extreme racist connotation which causes offence particularly to those of East Asian origin.

In 2004, the commission's counterpart, the Radio Authority, apologised for the offence caused by an incident where a DJ on Heart 106.2 used the term.

In a 2005 document commissioned by Ofcom titled "Language and Sexual Imagery in Broadcasting: A Contextual Investigation" their definition of chink was "a term of racial offence/abuse. However, this is polarising. Older and mainly white groups tend to think this is not usually used in an abusive way—e.g., let's go to the Chinky—which is not seen as offensive by those who aren't of East Asian origin; Chinky usually refers to food not a culture or race however, younger people, East Asians, particularly people of Chinese racial background and other non-white ethnic minorities feel the word 'Chinky, Chinkies or Chinkie' to be as insulting as 'paki' or 'nigger'."

In 2006, after several campaigns by the Scottish Executive, more people in Scotland now acknowledge that this name is indirectly racist.
As of 2016, British broadcasting regulator Ofcom considers the word to be "Strongest language, highly unacceptable without strong contextualisation. Seen as derogatory to Chinese people. More mixed views regarding use of the term to mean ‘Chinese takeaway’".

In 2014, the term gained renewed attention after a recording emerged of UKIP candidate Kerry Smith referring to a woman of Chinese background as a "chinky bird".

See also

 Ching chong – another ethnic slur used against Chinese people

References

Anti-Chinese sentiment
British slang
Anti–East Asian slurs
English words